Postplatyptilia genisei is a moth of the family Pterophoridae described by Pastrana in 1989. It is known from Argentina.

The wingspan is 19–21 mm. Adults are on wing in December, January, March and May.

References

genisei
Moths described in 1989